The Secret Six is a 1931 American pre-Code crime film starring Wallace Beery as "Slaughterhouse Scorpio", a character very loosely based on Al Capone, and featuring Lewis Stone, John Mack Brown, Jean Harlow, Clark Gable, Marjorie Rambeau and Ralph Bellamy.  The film was written by Frances Marion and directed by George W. Hill for MGM.

Plot
Bootlegger Johnny Franks recruits a crude working man called Louis "Slaughterhouse" Scorpio as part of the gang of mob boss Richard "Newt" Newton. Scorpio eventually becomes head of the organization himself. Then he is prosecuted by a secret group of six masked crime fighters, aided by newspaper reporters Carl Luckner and Hank Rogers.

Cast (in credits order)
 Wallace Beery as Louis 'Slaughterhouse' Scorpio
 Lewis Stone as Richard 'Newt' Newton
 John Mack Brown as Hank Rogers
 Jean Harlow as Anne Courtland
 Marjorie Rambeau as Peaches
 Paul Hurst as Nick 'The Gouger' Mizoski
 Clark Gable as Carl Luckner
 Ralph Bellamy as Johnny Franks
 John Miljan as Smiling Joe Colimo
 DeWitt Jennings as Chief Donlin
 Murray Kinnell as 'Dummy' Metz (alias of Fink)
 Fletcher Norton as Jimmy Delano
 Louis Natheaux as Eddie
 Frank McGlynn Sr. as Judge
 Theodore von Eltz as District Attorney Keeler
 Charles Giblyn ... Mr. Simms - Ballistics Expert (uncredited)
 Joseph W. Girard ... Official (uncredited)
 Tom London ... Blackjacking Gangster (uncredited)
 George Magrill ... Police Guard at Jailhouse (uncredited)
 Lee Phelps ... Smelts - Waiter (uncredited)
 Hector Sarno ... Finko (uncredited)

Context
The film was Ralph Bellamy's first screen role in what became a six-decade career. Despite being billed seventh in the cast, Clark Gable has more screen time than this implies, and much greater impact. Beery and Gable made Hell Divers (1932) the following year, this time with Gable's role and billing almost as large as Beery's. Beery, Harlow and Gable would work together again four years later in the epic seafaring  adventure China Seas (1935), only with their billing reversed and all three names (Gable, Harlow and Beery) above the title.

Box-office
According to MGM records, the film earned $708,000 in the US and Canada and $286,000 elsewhere resulting in a profit of $148,000.

References

External links
 
 
 
 

American black-and-white films
Metro-Goldwyn-Mayer films
1931 films
Films directed by George Hill
1931 crime films
Films produced by Irving Thalberg
Films about prohibition in the United States
Films with screenplays by Frances Marion
American crime films
1930s English-language films
1930s American films